Duffichthys is a genus of prehistoric lobe-finned fish which lived during the Late Devonian period. Fossils have been found at the locality of Scat Craig, Scotland.

References

Porolepiformes
Prehistoric lobe-finned fish genera
Devonian bony fish
Late Devonian animals
Late Devonian fish
Fossils of Great Britain